Florenţa Crăciunescu (later Ionescu, then Ţacu, 7 May 1955 – 8 June 2008) was a Romanian athlete. She won a bronze medal in the discus throw at the 1984 Olympics, finishing sixth in 1980; in 1984  she also placed eighth in the shot put. Her elder sister Carmen Ionesco competed in the same events for Canada at the 1984 Olympics.

References

1955 births
2008 deaths
Romanian female discus throwers
Athletes (track and field) at the 1980 Summer Olympics
Athletes (track and field) at the 1984 Summer Olympics
Olympic athletes of Romania
Olympic bronze medalists for Romania
Sportspeople from Craiova
Medalists at the 1984 Summer Olympics
Olympic bronze medalists in athletics (track and field)
Universiade medalists in athletics (track and field)
Universiade gold medalists for Romania
Burials at Ghencea Cemetery
Medalists at the 1979 Summer Universiade
Medalists at the 1983 Summer Universiade